ESIC Medical College may refer to one of several medical colleges in India:

 ESIC Medical College, Faridabad, in Haryana
 ESIC Medical College, Gulbarga, in Gulbarga
 ESIC Medical College, Kolkata, in West Bengal
 Government Medical College, Kollam, formerly ESIC Medical College, Parippally, in Kerala

See also
 ESIC (disambiguation)